Illiriia is a village in the Luhansk Raion of Luhansk Oblast in southeastern Ukraine. The population of Illiriia is 646 people. It has since 2014 been administered as a part of the de facto Luhansk People's Republic.

Yekaterinoslav Governorate

Villages in Luhansk Raion